The Ohio Penitentiary, also known as the Ohio State Penitentiary, was a prison operated from 1834 to 1984 in downtown Columbus, Ohio, in what is now known as the Arena District. The state had built a small prison in Columbus in 1813, but as the state's population grew the earlier facility was not able to handle the number of prisoners sent to it by the courts. When the penitentiary first opened in 1834, not all of the buildings were completed. The prison housed 5,235 prisoners at its peak in 1955. Prison conditions were described as "primitive" and the facility was eventually replaced by the Southern Ohio Correctional Facility, a maximum security facility in Lucasville. During its operation, it housed several well-known inmates, including General John H. Morgan, who famously escaped the prison during the Civil War, "Bugs" Moran, O. Henry, Chester Himes, and Sam Sheppard, whose story is said to have inspired the movie The Fugitive. A separate women's prison was built within its walls in 1837. The buildings were demolished in 1997.

History 
The prison was completed in 1815, replacing a more primitive one constructed by the Franklin County Court of Common Pleas a mile south in Franklinton. It initially consisted of 13 cells. Its first inmates were two brothers, John and David Evans, who arrived August 15, 1815.

Starting in 1897, 315 inmates were executed in the prison's electric chair. In 1885, the penitentiary became the site for executions, which had been carried out by local law enforcement officials up to that time. At first, prisoners condemned to death were executed by hanging, but in 1897 the electric chair replaced the prison's gallows. Both men and women were electrocuted between 1897 and 1963, when the death penalty was halted in Ohio. Tourists were encouraged to visit the Ohio State Penitentiary.

Among the wardens of the penitentiary was Charles C. Walcutt, a former general in the Union Army during the Civil War. The last warden was Terry Taylor.

1930 fire 

On April 21, 1930, a major fire killed 322 inmates and hospitalized another 230 in what was one of the deadliest fires in North American prison history. The fire started when a candle ignited oily rags on a roof in the prison's six-story West Block, east of Neil Avenue on the western edge of the prison. It was first noticed after prisoners had been locked in their cells for the evening.

Reports say that many guards refused to unlock cells when smoke entered the cell block and left the prisoners in their cells, although some did provide help. Some inmates overpowered a guard and took his keys, which they used to rescue other prisoners. A prison riot developed and firefighters arriving to fight the blaze were attacked with rocks.

A cordon of penitentiary guards was deployed about the towering prison walls. Other squads took up vantage points in guard towers and by this time 500 soldiers from Fort Hayes, a local military post, were on the scene. Machine guns were placed at the gates and on the walls. Bayonets were fixed and the troopers were ordered to shoot to kill. A troop of National Guardsmen soon augmented the regulars, and 30 minutes after the fire started the prison was completely surrounded.

Prison officials later alleged that three prisoners intentionally started the fire as part of an escape attempt, of which two were said to have committed suicide in the months after the event. Historians have disputed the veracity of this allegation, suggesting it was a means to divert attention from poor management of the fire.

The incident was the subject of then-inmate Chester Himes' story "To What Red Hell", published in Esquire in 1934, as well as his 1952  novel Cast the First Stone, republished unabridged in 1998 as Yesterday Will Make You Cry.

Riots 
The prison was the site of the "Halloween Riot", on October 31, 1952, which left one inmate dead and four injured, as well as the riot of August 1968, which ended with five dead inmates, five injured inmates and seven injured officers.

Inmate research 
In the 1950s, a prominent virologist named Chester M. Southam injected inmates from the Ohio State Penitentiary with HeLa cells in order to observe if people could be made immune to cancer by developing an acquired immune response. He compared the results of this experiment to an experiment in which he injected cancer cells into cancer patients, and observed that the prison subjects fought off the cancer faster than the subjects who had cancer. This case raised many ethical concerns, as many believe that it violated the bioethical principles of informed consent, non-maleficence, and beneficence.

Closure 
By 1979, the penitentiary had been renamed to the Columbus Correctional Facility, and was operating under a federal consent decree that mandated that it be closed by December 1983. The state phased out the prison, moving inmates to other facilities; the last inmate left the facility in August 1984.

After the closure of the Ohio Penitentiary in 1984, the building stood vacant for more than a decade, though it was used as a training site for a time by the Ohio National Guard, was briefly known as "The Demon Pen" for Halloween festivities, and attracted a number of urban explorers. The building also served as the setting for the 1985 made-for-TV movie Love on the Run, starring Stephanie Zimbalist and Alec Baldwin. The state eventually sold the property and building to the city of Columbus for development purposes in 1995. Demolition of the site was performed by S.G. Loewendick & Sons. Before demolition was approved, the Columbus mayor at the time, Buck Rinehart, personally took a wrecking ball to a portion of the building prematurely, and was ordered to have the damage patched.

The former penitentiary site now sits within the Arena District, with Burnham Square Condominiums, McFerson Commons, and several office buildings and parking garages now standing on the site.

Notable inmates

Gallery

References

Citations

Bibliography 
 
 
 
 Plummer, Elizabeth L. "Tourism at the Ohio Penitentiary" Timeline Ohio Historical Society January/February 2004 Volume 21 # 1
 Winning James R. "Behind These Walls", The Macmillan Co 1933

External links 

 Ohio Penitentiary, Ohio History Central
 The Ohio Penitentiary, Ohio Department of Rehabilitation and Correction
 Death of a Legend Book Closing on Another Chapter in Ohio History (a history of the Ohio Penitentiary), Ohio Department of Rehabilitation and Correction

Buildings and structures demolished in 1998
Capital punishment in Ohio
Defunct prisons in Ohio
1930 fires in the United States
Burned buildings and structures in the United States
Fires in Ohio
Demolished prisons
Arena District
1834 establishments in Ohio
1984 disestablishments in Ohio
Demolished buildings and structures in Downtown Columbus, Ohio